Coreoperca is a genus of temperate perches native to eastern Asia.  The members of the genus Coreoperca are known as the oriental perches or eastern perches, freshwater gamefish belonging to the family Percichthyidae.
These fish prefer clear, slow-moving currents on the middle reaches of rivers. Eggs are laid in May and June on plants. The eggs and fry are protected by the male.

Species
The currently recognized species in this genus are:
 Coreoperca herzi Herzenstein, 1896 
 Coreoperca kawamebari (Temminck & Schlegel, 1843)(Japanese Perch, Redfin perch)
 Coreoperca liui L. Cao & X. F. Liang, 2013
 Coreoperca whiteheadi Boulenger, 1900

References

External links

Sinipercidae